Radovan Grbović (Mratišić near Valjevo, 1760–1832) was a knez and voivode in the First Serbian Uprising. He took over both positions after the death of his brother Milovan Grbović, and in 1811 he was reaffirmed as the duke of the Kolubara principality in the Valjevo Nahiya.

In the period 1809-1813, he took part in the battles on the Drina, and during the time of relative calm, one of the commanders of the trench at Razanj.

He also fought in the second insurrection but was soon was pushed into the background by Miloš Obrenović. Radovan's son Luka Grbović also participated in the revolutionary wars under Miloš.

Literature 
 Record of Karađorđe Petrović, Belgrade 1848;
 Record protocol of the letter priest Matija Nenadović on the war along the Drina in 1811, 1812 and 1813, Belgrade 1861;
 Memoirs of Matija Nenadović, Belgrade 1867;

References 

1760 births
1832 deaths
19th-century Serbian nobility